William A. Wojnar, Ph.D. is a classical organist and a professor emeritus of music at Jamestown College, Jamestown, North Dakota.

Education
Dr. Wojnar was born in 1951 in Milwaukee, Wisconsin, one of three children of Anthony and Dorothy Wojnar.  He attended public schools there and then matriculated to Carroll College (now Carroll University) in Waukesha Wisconsin.  Wojnar studied at Carroll as a protégé of the renowned organist, Professor Phyllis Stringham, and was a student of Dr. Cardon V. Burnham, a published composer and director.  William obtained his Bachelor of Arts degree in 1974 and attained finalist status in the same year in the national competition sponsored by the American Guild of Organists (AGO). He then moved to the University of Illinois Urbana-Champaign, completing work on an Master of Arts degree in 1978. After one year of teaching at Southern Oregon University in Ashland, OR, Wojnar joined the faculty at Jamestown College. He continued work thereafter on a doctoral degree at the University of Iowa under the direction of Professor Delbert Disselhorst, and ultimately earned his Ph.D. in 1986.

Scholarly career
Dr. Wojnar is the former chairperson of the Music Department at Jamestown College. He taught applied piano and organ, keyboard pedagogy, music theory, and music history. He conducted scholarly research on the music of H.F. Quehl (a baroque composer) in the major music libraries of Germany and Poland. Wojnar was the Jamestown College Chapel organist, playing the Black-Schlossman Memorial Organ. He has also concertized in the midwest United States and is a member of the AGO.

References

1951 births
Living people
American classical organists
American male organists
Musicians from Milwaukee
University of Illinois Urbana-Champaign alumni
University of Iowa alumni
People from Jamestown, North Dakota
Carroll University alumni
Southern Oregon University faculty
Classical musicians from Wisconsin
American people of Polish descent
Male classical organists